—The following table lists the independent African states, and their memberships in selected organisations and treaties.

Notes

See also
List of countries in Africa
List of countries by GNI (nominal) per capita
Africa
List of conflicts in Africa
List of international rankings
International organization

 
Africa